The Achterhoek (Dutch Low Saxon: Achterhook) is a cultural region in the Eastern Netherlands.
Its name (meaning "rear-corner") is geographically appropriate because the area lies in the easternmost part of the province of Gelderland and therefore in the east of the Netherlands, protruding into Germany. The Achterhoek lies at the east of the IJssel and Oude IJssel rivers. On the other sides, it borders Germany to the southeast and the province of Overijssel to the northeast.

In 2015, the Achterhoek had a population of 389,682. The region is also called de Graafschap (Dutch for earldom, shire or county; namesake of VBV De Graafschap in Doetinchem) because it coincides with the historical County of Zutphen. The region is predominantly rural, with much open space, forests and farms. The area around the city of Winterswijk is regarded as noteworthy. A well-known beer originates from this region: Grolsch beer was first brewed in Groenlo in 1615.

Language
The original language of the Achterhoek is Achterhooks, a variety of Low Saxon. The language can also differ per municipality or town, even in such a way that a person speaking the 'Grols' variant (meaning the dialect of Groenlo) will pronounce words differently from a person from Winterswijk which is merely 10 km (6.2 mi) to the east, although they will probably understand each other.

The number of inhabitants whose sole language is Achterhooks has greatly declined over the last 60 years, inhabitants are raised with Dutch at school and the dialect is only spoken (sometimes) at home. Partly due to immigration from outside the Achterhoek region and the effects of national government, the Dutch language is having a significant impact on the dialect. Many old words have been forgotten and replaced by their Dutch-derived equivalents.

Municipalities 
The largest cities in the Achterhoek are Doetinchem, Winterswijk and Zutphen. Doesburg and Zutphen are old Hanseatic cities. Both have centres with well-preserved historical buildings. 
 Aalten
 Berkelland
 Bronckhorst
 Doesburg
 Doetinchem
 Lochem
 Montferland
 Oost Gelre
 Oude IJsselstreek
 Winterswijk
 Zutphen

External links

Website: Achterhoek Tourism
Website: Achterhoek Promotion
Website: Achterhoek History

 
Regions of Gelderland
Regions of the Netherlands